Mariner was launched at Whitehaven in 1804. In 1814 an American privateer captured her but the British Royal Navy recaptured her. On 23 August 1823 her crew abandoned Mariner, which then foundered in the Atlantic.

Career
Mariner first appeared in Lloyd's Register (LR) in 1804 with J.Askew, master and owner, and trade Dublin–Whitehaven.

On 1 July 1813 the American privateer Yankee, of eighteen 12-pounder guns and one 18-pounder captured Mariner, Fraser. master, off Ireland. The day before Yankee had captured several other British merchantmen. Yankee paroled her master and crew and then put them on a boat and premitted them to land. 

Mariners cargo of rum and sugar was valued at $70,000. Although Yankee had sent her for France, she arrived at Providence, Rhode Island on 19 August.

On 29 August  recaptured Mariner. On 26 October LL reported that Poictiers had captured Mariner, Frazer, master, from Jamaica to Belfast, and Watson, Gregg, master. from Maranham to Liverpool. Poictiers sent them both to Halifax. On 5 June 1814 Mariner "(retaken)" sailed for Belfast.

In February 1820 Mariner, Richmond, master, was driven ashore near Castletown, Isle of Man. She was on a voyage from Dublin to Maryport.

Fate
On 2 September, Dido, Bliss, master, arrived at Liverpool from Philadelphia. She brought the news that on 23 August she had spoken Mary, Ford, master, Liverpool to Quebec, and Mariner, of Maryport, Brown, master. On 15 August Mariner had sprung a leak and Mary had agreed to accompany her. The next report was that her crew had abandoned Mariner in the Atlantic Ocean on 23 August while she was on a voyage from Ayr to Richibucto, New Brunswick. Mary, Ford, master, had taken the crew on board, and then transferred them to Hope, Porter, master, which had arrived at Belfast on 16 September.Mariner sank on the same day that her crew had abandoned her.

Notes, citations, and references
Notes

Citations

References
 
 

1804 ships
Age of Sail merchant ships of England
Captured ships
Maritime incidents in February 1820
Maritime incidents in August 1823